Gisele Marie "Gigi" Marvin  (born March 7, 1987) is an American ice hockey player for the Boston Pride of the National Women's Hockey League. As a member of the United States national women's ice hockey team, Marvin won a silver medal at the 2010 Olympic Winter Games and the 2014 Winter Olympics, and a gold medal at the 2018 Winter Olympics. Her grandfather is Cal Marvin, the coach of the 1958 United States Men's National Ice Hockey Team and the manager of the 1965 United States Men's National Ice Hockey Team, is a member of the United States Hockey Hall of Fame. She hails from Warroad, Minnesota, in Roseau County, the same small northern Minnesota town as 1960 gold medalists Bill and Roger Christian and 1980 gold medalist Dave Christian and 2018 Stanley Cup champion T. J. Oshie.

Playing career

High school
Marvin attended Warroad High School and was named the 2005 recipient of the Let's Play Hockey Ms. Hockey Award. During her freshman, junior, and senior seasons, she was an All-state honoree. As a senior, she helped the Warroad Warriors to an 18–5–1 record. Statistically, her greatest year was as a senior, when she accumulated 112 points, including 55 goals. She finished her high school career ranking fifth in Minnesota state career scoring (196 goals and 229 assists for 425 points).
 She earned four letters in hockey, and five letters in both cross-country and softball.

Minnesota Golden Gophers
While playing for the Minnesota Golden Gophers women's ice hockey program, Marvin was twice in the top 10 for the Patty Kazmaier Memorial Award (2008 and 2009). She finished her Minnesota career sixth on the school's all-time scoring list with 195 points (87 goals and 108 assists).
As a freshman, she appeared in 41 games and scored 16 goals and 30 assists for 46 points. She tied for fourth in the WCHA in overall scoring and second in assists. She had seven power-play goals, three game-winning goals, and one short-handed goal. In addition, she was named the WCHA Rookie of the Week five times. On October 7, 2005, she earned her first career goal on her first career shot in a 3–0 win over Connecticut. In the 2006 WCHA playoffs, Marvin made several contributions. She notched three goals and two assists in the WCHA first round against Minnesota State. On March 11, Marvin set up Jenelle Philipczyk for the game-winning goal in the 2–1 win over Minnesota Duluth. She would assist on Allie Sanchez' power-play goal in the WCHA Championship game against Wisconsin. For her efforts, she was named to the WCHA All-Tournament Team. She led WCHA Rookies in scoring and was named WCHA Rookie of the Year. For her efforts, she was named to the All-WHCA Rookie Team and was an All-WCHA third team selection.

In her sophomore year (2006–07), Marvin led the team with 38 points (18 goals, 20 assists) in 35 games. For her efforts, she earned All-WCHA First Team honors. During her junior year Marvin led the team with 23 goals, 31 assists and 54 points and earned an All-WCHA First Team honoree. She was an RBK All-America Second Team selection and was named to the WCHA All-Tournament Team. As a senior (2008–09), she helped the Gophers advance to the NCAA Women's Frozen Four. She earned All-WCHA Second Team honors and was named WCHA Outstanding Student-Athlete of the Year.

USA Hockey
Marvin is a three-time participant in the International Ice Hockey Federation World Women's Championships. She won gold in 2008 and 2009, while winning the silver in 2007. Prior to the IIHF championships, she was a participant on the United States Women's Select Team for the Four Nations Cup. (The team finished first in 2008 and second in both 2006 and 2007.) In addition, Marvin was a four-time USA Hockey Women's National Festival participant (2006–09).

Minnesota Whitecaps
After the 2010 Winter Games, Marvin joined the Whitecaps for their 2010–11 season. On October 8, against former WCHA rival, St. Cloud State, Marvin scored a goal.

Boston Blades
For the 2012–13 season, Marvin joined the Boston Blades of the Canadian Women's Hockey League and helped the squad claim the 2013 Clarkson Cup.

Boston Pride
On September 25, 2015, it was announced that Marvin had signed a contract to play for the Boston Pride of the National Women's Hockey League. Participating in the 2016 NWHL All-Star Game, Marvin would compete in the Isobel Cup finals. She would score the second goal in Cup history, during the second period of Game 1 against the Buffalo Beauts. She would end her season by winning the 2016 NWHL Defensive Player of the Year Award. Marvin was selected for the 2017 All-Star Game in February 2017 via a fan vote.

Awards and honors
USA Hockey
Seven-time member of the U.S. Women's National Team for the International Ice Hockey Federation World Women's Championship (gold-2008,09,11,13,17 silver-2007,12) ... Three-time member of the U.S. Women's Select Team for the Four Nations Cup (1st-2008, 2nd-2006-07). Led the team with four assists in 2008 ... Three-time member of the U.S. Women's Under-22 Select Team for the Under-22 Series with Canada. Led the team with four points (1–3) in 2008 ... Four-time USA Hockey Women's National Festival participant (2006–09) ... Four-time USA Hockey Player Development Camp attendee (2002–05).

College
She played four seasons at the University of Minnesota of the Western Collegiate Hockey Association, where she was twice in the top 10 for the Patty Kazmaier Memorial Award (2008–09) ... Finished her career sixth on the school's all-time scoring list with 195 points (87–108). As a Senior (2008–09): Helped the Gophers advance to the NCAA Women's Frozen Four ... Earned All-WCHA Second Team honors ... Named WCHA Outstanding Student-Athlete of the Year. As a Junior (2007–08): Led the team with 23 goals, 31 assists and 54 points ... All-WCHA First Team honoree ... RBK All-America Second Team selection ... Named to the WCHA All-Tournament Team. As a Sophomore (2006–07): Led the team with 38 points (18–20) in 35 games ... Earned All-WCHA First Team honors. As a Freshman (2005–06): Second on the team with 46 points (30–16) ... WCHA Rookie of the Year ... All-WCHA Third Team selection ... Led the WCHA in rookie scoring ... Finished fourth in the WCHA in points and second in assists ... Named to the WCHA All-Tournament Team.

 First-Team All-WCHA, 2007
 First-Team All-WCHA, 2008
Second Team All-Americans, 2008
 Third-Team All-WCHA, 2006
Top Ten Finalist, Patty Kazmaier Award, 2008
Top Ten Finalist, Patty Kazmaier Award, 2009
 WCHA Rookie of the Year, 2006
 WCHA All-Rookie Team, 2006
 2008–09 WCHA Pre-season Most Valuable Player
 2008–09 WCHA Student Athlete of the Year

NWHL
 2016 NWHL Defensive Player of the Year Award

Career statistics
The following are career stats from the University of Minnesota
Note: GP= Games played; G= Goals; AST= Assists; PTS = Points; PPG = Power Play Goals; SHG = Short handed Goals

See also
Ice hockey at the 2010 Winter Olympics – Women's tournament
Minnesota Golden Gophers women's ice hockey
2008–09 Minnesota Golden Gophers women's ice hockey team
2009–10 United States national women's ice hockey team

References

External links
 
 
 
 

1987 births
Living people
People from Warroad, Minnesota
American women's ice hockey forwards
Boston Blades players
Boston Pride players
Clarkson Cup champions
Ice hockey players from Minnesota
Ice hockey players at the 2010 Winter Olympics
Ice hockey players at the 2014 Winter Olympics
Ice hockey players at the 2018 Winter Olympics
Isobel Cup champions
Medalists at the 2010 Winter Olympics
Medalists at the 2014 Winter Olympics
Medalists at the 2018 Winter Olympics
Minnesota Golden Gophers women's ice hockey players
Minnesota Ms. Hockey Award winners
Minnesota Whitecaps players
Premier Hockey Federation players
Olympic gold medalists for the United States in ice hockey
Olympic silver medalists for the United States in ice hockey
Professional Women's Hockey Players Association players